Halina Schmolz (born Halina Szmolcówna, 25 December 1892 – 28 September 1939) was a Polish ballet dancer.

Early life
Halina Szmolcówna was the daughter of Ignatz Szmolz and Barbara Szmolcówna. She trained as a dancer in Warsaw.

Career
Halina Schmolz first appeared on stage in London in 1910, in the company of Anna Pavlova and Mikhail Mordkin. In 1911 and 1912, she danced in the United States, including New York and Philadelphia, with Alexandre Volinin. "Alone, or in company, she flitted through the most amazing and fascinating gyrations," a North Carolina newspaper marveled. She toured Australia and New Zealand in 1913, billed as a member of the Imperial Russian Ballet, with Volonin, Vlasta Novotna, Adeline Genée and others. 

She appeared in a short film, Spiew labedzi, in 1914. She was performing in Russia in 1915 and 1916, then on tour again with Sergei Diaghilev in 1918 and 1919, in Paris and London. She was regularly seen at the Theatr Wielki, in Warsaw, and was the prima ballerina of the Warsaw Opera until 1934. She also taught dance at her home in Saska Kępa neighborhood, and at the T. Wysocka Stage Dance School in Warsaw.

Personal life
Halina Szmolcówna became the second wife of Grzegorz Fitelberg, a composer and conductor with the Polish Radio Orchestra, in 1928. In 1939 she was wounded near their home in the bombing of Poniatowski Bridge during World War II; she died a few weeks later. She was 46 years old. Her home in Saska Kępa has been restored in recent years.

References

External links

"History of the Polish National Ballet", Teatr Wielki Opera Narodowa.

1892 births
1939 deaths
Polish ballerinas
Polish civilians killed in World War II
Deaths by airstrike during World War II
20th-century Polish ballet dancers